Pierre Parcevich (1608–1674) was a Roman Catholic prelate who served as Titular Bishop of Marcianopolis (1656–1674).

Biography
Pierre Parcevich was born in Chiprovatz in 1608.
On 6 March 1656, he was appointed during the papacy of Pope Alexander VII as Titular Bishop of Marcianopolis and Vicar Apostolic.
On 25 March 1656, he was consecrated bishop by Marcantonio Franciotti, Cardinal-Priest of Santa Maria della Pace. 
He served as Titular Bishop of Marcianopolis until his death on 23 July 1674.

References

External links and additional sources
 (for Chronology of Bishops) 
 (for Chronology of Bishops) 

17th-century Roman Catholic titular bishops
Bishops appointed by Pope Alexander VII
1608 births
1674 deaths